These are the results for the 34th edition of the Ronde van Nederland cycling race, which was held from August 15 to August 19, 1994. The race started in Breda (North Brabant) and finished in Valkenburg (Limburg).

Stages

15-08-1994: Breda-Nieuwegein, 180 km

16-08-1994: Nieuwegein-Ede, 178 km

17-08-1994: Ede-Haaksbergen, 101 km

17-08-1994: Haaksbergen-Haaksbergen (Time Trial), 31 km

18-08-1994: Doetinchem-Venlo, 180 km

19-08-1994: Venlo-Valkenburg, 198 km

Final classification

External links
Wielersite Results

Ronde van Nederland
1994 in road cycling
1994 in Dutch sport
August 1994 sports events in Europe